Elias Elia Christodoulou (born 6 November 1985) is a Cypriot footballer who for AEZ Zakakiou as a defensive midfielder.

Career
Elia comes from Aris Limassol academies until 2002 when he was promoted to the men's team of the club. During his ten-year presence in Aris, Elia had 95 league match appearances and scored 8 goals both in first and second division. Next years Elia was wondered in some clubs of the second division. In 2012, he moved to APEP for only one season and played in thirteen matches. His next club was Nikos & Sokratis Erimis with which he had 37 appearances and scored 1 goal in two seasons. In May 2015, Elia signed for AEZ Zakakiou.

Personal life
Before 2014 was named as Elias Elia but since then he decided to change his surname to Christodoulou.

References

External links

1985 births
Living people
Cypriot footballers
Aris Limassol FC players
APEP FC players
Nikos & Sokratis Erimis FC players
AEZ Zakakiou players
Cypriot First Division players
Association football defenders
Association football midfielders